Sandra Schumacher (born 25 December 1966) is a retired track cyclist and road bicycle racer, who represented West Germany at the 1984 Summer Olympics. There she won the bronze medal in the women's road race, finishing behind USA riders Connie Carpenter-Phinney (gold) and Rebecca Twigg (silver).

References

External links
 
 
 

1966 births
Living people
German female cyclists
Cyclists at the 1984 Summer Olympics
Olympic cyclists of West Germany
Olympic bronze medalists for West Germany
Cyclists from Cologne
Olympic medalists in cycling
Medalists at the 1984 Summer Olympics
20th-century German women
21st-century German women